In mathematics, the Burkill integral is an integral introduced by  for calculating areas. It is a special case of the Kolmogorov integral.

References

Definitions of mathematical integration